Noeeta alini is a species of tephritid or fruit flies in the genus Noeeta of the family Tephritidae.

Distribution
China.

References

Tephritinae
Insects described in 1951
Diptera of Asia